Os Dias Levantados is the tenth album by the Portuguese music composer António Pinho Vargas. It was released in 2003.

Track listing

References

António Pinho Vargas albums
2003 albums